The 1817 New Hampshire gubernatorial election was held on March 11, 1817.

Incumbent Democratic-Republican Governor William Plumer defeated Federalist nominees James Sheafe and Jeremiah Mason.

General election

Major candidates
William Plumer, Democratic-Republican, incumbent Governor
James Sheafe, Federalist, former U.S. Senator, Federalist nominee for Governor in 1816

Minor candidates
The following candidates may not have been formally nominated and attracted only scattering votes.

Josiah Bartlett Jr., Democratic-Republican, former U.S. Representative
Jeremiah Mason, Federalist, incumbent U.S. Senator

Results

Notes

References

1817
New Hampshire
Gubernatorial